McCoy is an unincorporated community in Atascosa County, Texas, United States. According to the Handbook of Texas, the community had a population of 30 in 2000. It is located within the San Antonio metropolitan area.

History
McCoy was named for local settler and rancher W.A. McCoy. This community was built on land that he bought for a right-of-way for the San Antonio, Uvalde, and Gulf Railroad in 1913. A post office was established at McCoy that next year and had a population of 70. There was one business in McCoy in 1933. It had a railroad station, a general store, and a few scattered homes in 1952. It had three businesses in 1970. The community had a few peanut farms in 1987. It had a population of 25 from 1945 to the early 1990s, had ten businesses in 1992, and had a population of 30 in 2000.

Although it is unincorporated, McCoy has a post office, with the ZIP code of 78113.

Geography

Education
McCoy had a school with two classrooms in 1920. The school had two more classrooms added and had an enrollment of 173 students and five teachers employed in 1935. It closed in 1950 and joined with the schools in Leal. The abandoned school building remained in 1952. Today the community is served by the Pleasanton Independent School District.

Notable Person
 W. Page Keeton, attorney and dean of the University of Texas School of Law

References

Unincorporated communities in Atascosa County, Texas
Unincorporated communities in Texas
Greater San Antonio